Daroff is a surname. Notable people with the surname include:

Robert B. Daroff (born 1936), American neurologist
William Daroff (born 1968), American lawyer and political campaigner